Rev. Hibbert Newton D.D. (1817 – 1892) was a poet and an early proponent of British Israelism.

Career

Hibbert Newton was educated at Trinity College, Dublin obtaining a B.A. in divinity studies, followed by a doctorate. He was ordained in 1847 and became vicar of St Michael's, Southwark, London, serving from 1867 to his death. He also was a successful poet and wrote a short tract entitled Israel Discovered in Anglo-Saxon, Protestant Kindred Nations (1874) which alongside Edward Hine's publications was one of the early influential works on British Israelism.

Works

Poetry 

The vale of Tempe; and other poems (1830)
The flight of the apostate (1849)
The fall of Babylon: an epic poem (1864)

British Israelism 

Israel Discovered in Anglo-Saxon, Protestant Kindred Nations (1874)

References

External links
 Israel Discovered in Anglo-Saxon, Protestant Kindred Nations

1817 births
1892 deaths
British Israelism